Jackson Walls (born 1 January 2003) is an Australian racing driver currently racing in the Porsche Carrera Cup Australia.

Career

Australian F4 Championship
In 2018 Walls jumped into a single seater car for the first time competitively with the Patrizicorse team in the Australian F4 Championship. A string of successful midfield results as well as 3 podium finishes put him 6th with 148. Walls returned for the next campaign and his results were similar to the previous year, he took his maiden career victory at Tailem Bend, Lochie Hughes who started on pole initially took the victory after taking the lead back from Walls. Contact with Ryan Suhle caused the stewards to award Hughes with a 5 seconds penalty, allowing Walls to take the top step of the podium.

F3 Asian Championship
Walls and Hitech Grand Prix joined forced for the final 3 rounds of the F3 Asian Championship season. Walls made an immediate impact when he finished on the podium for the second time of asking He scored the next podium at the season finale in Shanghai, 20 seconds behind race winner Jack Doohan. Ukyo Sasahara finished 2nd that race meaning Hitech achieved that only 1-2-3 for that season. Walls finished the season 6th with 90 points.

Toyota Racing Series
Walls missed the opening round of the 2019 Toyota Racing Series as he was only 15 years old. He finished the season 12th with a highest result of 5th coming at Hampton Downs. Walls returned to the mtec Motorsport seat for the 2020 season. Walls won his only race of the season at Pukekohe Park Raceway, he started on reverse grid pole an fought most of the race against Czech teammate Petr Ptáček.

Personal life
Walls's father, Tony, is a racing driver competing in events such as the Australian GT Championship and Lamborghini Super Trofeo. Jackson Walls's manager Michael Patrizi is also a racing driver.

Racing record

Career summary

References

External links
 

2003 births
Living people
Australian racing drivers
F3 Asian Championship drivers
Toyota Racing Series drivers
Hitech Grand Prix drivers
R-ace GP drivers
Australian F4 Championship drivers